Springfield Municipal Airport  is a town owned, public use airport located four nautical miles (5 mi, 7 km) north of the central business district of Springfield, a town in Baca County, Colorado, United States.

Facilities and aircraft 
Springfield Municipal Airport covers an area of 40 acres (16 ha) at an elevation of 4,390 feet (1,338 m) above mean sea level. It has one runway designated 17/35 with a concrete surface measuring 5,000 by 60 feet (1,524 x 18 m).

For the 12-month period ending December 31, 2010, the airport had 2,560 general aviation aircraft operations, an average of 213 per month. At that time there were six aircraft single-engine based at this airport.

References

External links 
 Airport page at Springfield website
 Springfield Municipal Airport (8V7) at Colorado DOT Airport Directory
 Aerial image as of October 1988 from USGS The National Map
 
 

Airports in Colorado
Buildings and structures in Baca County, Colorado